Isaac Touro (1738 – 8 December 1783) was a Dutch-born American rabbi. He was a Jewish leader in colonial America. Born in Amsterdam, in 1758 he left for Jamaica. In 1760, he arrived  in Newport, Rhode Island to serve as hazzan and spiritual leader of Jeshuath Israel, a Portuguese Sephardic congregation.  Soon after his arrival the congregation built the Touro Synagogue, which is the oldest synagogue in the United States.

When the American Revolution broke out, Touro was a Loyalist, and when the British captured Newport in 1776, he remained in the city with his wife Reyna and their children, while many of his Whig congregants fled.  In 1779, he moved with the British to New York, but he had no means of supporting himself there, and was dependent on British charity, so in 1782 he moved to Kingston, Jamaica, where he died in 1783.

His sons Abraham  and Judah were renowned philanthropists.

Touro College named for the Touro family

Touro College, chartered in New York State in 1970, takes its name from the Touro family of Judah Touro and his father Isaac Touro. Judah Touro and Isaac Touro were Jewish community leaders of colonial America, who represent the ideals upon which Touro College bases its mission. Inspired by the democratic ethos enunciated by founding US President, George Washington at Newport, Rhode Island when he visited the Touro Synagogue in 1790, the Touro family provided major endowments for universities, the first free library on the North American continent, community health facilities in the United States, and pioneering settlements in Israel.

References

Sources
 The Jewish Press, Glimpses Into American Jewish History, October 4, 2006
  Jewish Virtual Library bio

1738 births
1783 deaths
18th-century Dutch rabbis
18th-century Sephardi Jews
American emigrants to Jamaica
American people of Dutch-Jewish descent
American people of Portuguese-Jewish descent
American Sephardic Jews
Dutch emigrants to the United States
Dutch Sephardi Jews
Hazzans
Jews and Judaism in New York (state)
Loyalists in the American Revolution from Rhode Island
People of the Province of New York
Rabbis from Amsterdam
People from Kingston, Jamaica
People from Newport, Rhode Island
Sephardi rabbis
Touro College people
Rabbis from New York (state)
18th-century American rabbis